Soo Kim is a Korean-American artist. She was born in South Korea in 1969 and moved to Los Angeles in 1980. She earned a B.A. from the University of California, Riverside, and a MFA from California Institute of the Arts. Kim lives in Los Angeles and is on the faculty at Otis College of Art and Design. Kim often employs techniques of cutting and layering in order to introduce areas of absence or disruption in what we tend to take for granted—the interpretation of photographic images."

Kim’s work is in the collection of the J. Paul Getty Museum. In 2013, Kim was awarded the prestigious John Gutmann Photography Fellowship by the San Francisco Foundation.

Selected solo exhibitions 
 Midday Moon, Angles Gallery, Los Angeles, CA, 2012 
 Black Sun, Angles Gallery, Los Angeles, CA, 2011 
 The Corners of the Sea, Julie Saul Gallery, New York, NY, 2010 
 Faraway, Seaver Gallery, Marlborough School, Los Angeles, CA, 2010 
 Superheavies, Sandroni Rey, Los Angeles, CA, 2008 
 They Stop Looking at the Sky, Pasadena Museum of California Art, Pasadena, CA, 2006
 A Week Inside Two Days, Sandroni Rey, Los Angeles, CA, 2005 
 The Future’s Owned By You and Me, Los Angeles County Metropolitan Transportation Authority, Los Angeles, CA, 2005 
 Soo Kim: New Work, Sandroni Rey, Venice, CA, 2002 
 Soo Kim: New Work, Montgomery Gallery, Claremont, CA (catalog), 1999 
 Stonewashing, Bandits-mages, Bourges, France, 1995 
 (Carry) A Big Stick, Tropical Installations, Los Angeles, CA, 1993

Selected public collections 
 J. Paul Getty Museum
 Los Angeles County Museum of Art
 Albright-Knox Art Gallery
The Broad Foundation
 Judith and Michael Ovitz Collection
 Susan Bay and Leonard Nimoy Collection
 Joyce and Ted Strauss Collection
 Museum of Photographic Arts, San Diego
 North Carolina Museum of Art
 The California Museum of Photography, University of California, Riverside
 University Art Museum, University of California, Santa Barbara
 University of California, Irvine

Further reading 
 Miles, Christopher “Soo Kim: Pasadena Museum of California Art” Artforum International, March, 2006
 “Exhibitionism”, Soo Kim: They Stop Looking at the Sky, Flaunt, Issue 72, p. 249
 Yang, Andrew, “Packed House”, Surface, The Annual Avant Guardian Issue: American Intelligence #56, p. 79
 Kovats, Tania, “Dreams and the Nets to Catch Them”, The Drawing Book: A Survey of Drawing: The Primary Means of Expression, Black Dog Press
 Hagen, Kathryn and Parme Guintini, editors. Garb, Prentice Hall, 2006
 Hoon, Jung, “Trans, Transit, Transition”, Seoul Photo Triennale catalogue and website, Seoul, Korea, 2006
 Wood, Eve. ArtUS, Issue #11, Dec. ’05 – Feb. ‘06. Review for the exhibition at SolwayJones Gallery, Los Angeles, CA, Sept. 10-Oct. 15, 2005.
 New American Paintings, Pacific Coast Edition, Volume # 61.
 “Continuing and Recommended,” Art Scene. Vol. 25, No. 2. October, 2005. p. 27.
 Kraus, Chris. "Icons and Puzzles." ReMake/ReModel.  Catalogue essay for the exhibition at SolwayJones Gallery, Los Angeles, CA, Sept. 10-Oct. 15, 2005.
 Valentine, Christina. "Myopic Dreams: The Elusiveness of Sight." ReMake/ReModel. Catalogue essay for the exhibition at SolwayJones Gallery, Los Angeles, CA, Sept. 10-Oct. 15, 2005.
 Walsh, Daniella, “Orange Blossoms”, Riviera, p. 280-281, September 2004
 Chang, Richard, “The Art of the New”, The Orange County Register, Arts and Entertainment section pages 1–5, Sunday, October 10, 2004
 Simon, Jane, Elizabeth Armstrong and Irene Hofmann, 2004 California Biennial, Orange County Museum of Art, exhibition catalogue, pgs cover, 2, 72-75, 134
 Scarborough, James. “Unlikely Icons,” New York Arts Magazine, online and September 2003
 Paschal, Huston, Linda Johnson Dougherty, Robert Wohl, Anne Collins Goodyear, and Laura M. Andre, Defying Gravity: Contemporary Art and Flight, North Carolina Museum of Art / Prestel Verlag Press, exhibition catalogue. p. VII, 136-139, 209
 Martinez, Lillian. “Scratch Visual,” El Diario de Hoy de El Salvador, pg. 1-4, February 6, 2003
 Yi, Paul. There: Sites of Korean Diaspora, The Gwangju Biennale, Gwangju, Korea
 Geldard, Rebecca. “London is Balling,” Time Out London, p. 50 March 13–20, 2002
 Pagel, David. “Art Review,” The Los Angeles Times, Calendar Section F32 Friday 15 February 2002
 Myers, Holly “Five with Promise,” The Los Angeles Times, 30 March 2001
 “Korean American Artists,” Wolgan Misool Art Magazine, June 2000
 Lee, Choong Gul, “Exhibitions: KOREAMERICAKOREA,” Vogue Korea, June 2000
 “Pick for the week of May 24–30, 2000,” City Pages, May 2000
 Ross, David A. and Sunjung Kim, KOREAMERICAKOREA exhibition catalogue with essays by Miwon Kwon, Laura Kang, and David Ross
 Schwabsky, Barry “Summer Exhibition Previews,” ArtForum, May 2000
 Ollman, Leah, “Darkness and Light,” The Los Angeles Times, 31 March 2000
 McGrew, Rebecca, In-Between Places: Recent Work by Soo Jin Kim, catalogue essay, Pomona College 1999
 Walsh, Daniella, The Orange County Register, “A Visit to ‘Other Related Areas’”, October 25, 1998
 Schoenkopf, Rebecca, OC Weekly, “Cool World”, October 23–29, 1998
 Curtis, Cathy, Los Angeles Times, “When Seeing Isn’t Believing”, October 12, 1998
 Frank, Peter, LA Weekly, “Pick of the Week”, September 18–25, 1998
 Ise, Claudine, Los Angeles Times, Art Reviews, August 21, 1998
 Green, Phyllis, KXLU 88.9FM, “Look/Hear”, May 31, 1998
 Frank, Peter, LA Weekly, “Pick of the Week”, December 29, 1995
 Chung, Terry, KoreAm Journal, Winter, 1993
 Chau, Monica, The Subject of Rape, “Tall Tales or True Stories: The Subject of Rape in Recent Video Art”, The Whitney Museum of American Art, 1993
 “Asian Film Scene: From Behind the Camera”, KoreAm Journal, May,1993
 Snow, Shauna, Los Angeles Times, “Identity Trapped Between the Sheets”, July 31, 1992

External links
 Soo Kim website

References

American contemporary artists
Living people
American photographers
American women photographers
Conceptual photographers
1969 births
Otis College of Art and Design faculty
American women academics
21st-century American women